"Hong Kong Kids" or "Kong Kids" (Kong Hai; ; Putonghua: Gǎng Hái) is a derogatory expression that refers to a subset of children or teenagers in Hong Kong who are overly dependent on their families, have low emotional intelligence and lack self-management skills. 
The term "Kong Kids" was coined in 2009 in a book titled Kong Kids: The Nightmares for Parents and Teachers published by Ming Pao. The book argues that there are five negative characteristics common in children born in Hong Kong after the 1990s.

Description
They are typically born during the 1990s to 2000s, belong to middle-class families, and are pampered and spoiled by family members.

Kong Kids typically have several common characteristics. As young children, they often lack life skills, such as bathing, cooking, and tying shoelaces. They are used to relying on their parents and foreign domestic helpers.

According to a survey by People's Daily Online, almost half of the parents who responded said that their children cannot eat, bathe or dress themselves independently and 15% of the respondents even said their children could not use the toilet independently. When faced with difficulty, "Kong Kids" expect others to solve the problems, because they are inexperienced with managing setbacks and have low self-esteem.

They are usually emotional and self-centred. With low Emotional Quotient (EQ), Kong Kids cannot control their emotion in any circumstances, such as dealing with unpleasant situations. They want to be under the spotlight and cared for by everyone.

Kong Kids are almost always not willing or able to solve problems by themselves. Being afraid of failure, they evade adversity and rely on parents.

They are usually weak in interpersonal communication and self-control. Being self-centred, they cannot put themselves into others' shoes and respect others' opinions. They lack basic manners and come into conflicts easily.

Most of the parents are over-protective of their children and shield them from difficulties and injuries. They are often referred to as "monster parents". Parents usually hire foreign domestic helpers to take care of their children, spoil them excessively and satisfy  most of their requests. Indulging by parents may lead children to narcissism.

Kong Kids often love chasing new trends and pursuing well-known brands. Most of them own brand name goods and electronic gadgets such as mobile phones, iPads, iPods, digital cameras, etc. They do not treasure what they have and look for a materialistic life.

Causes
Nowadays, Hong Kong families typically have one or at most two children. According to some educational experts, some so-called 'monster parents' protect their children so well that they do not allow children to experience any setback. For instance, in 2010, the Hong Kong students could not get on the planes  because of a snowstorm in London. The parents then strongly requested the government to  assist students stranded at the airport. This issue induced a lot of criticisms towards  parents because of their over-protection. The over-protected children hence have low resilience and can hardly overcome difficulties, which results in Kong Kids.

Most parents in Hong Kong also work full-time. This frequently means they employ a foreign domestic helper to take care of their children. According to a survey, nearly 90% of parents employ a foreign domestic helper to take care of their children. The domestic helpers are not responsible for correcting children's behaviour even though the kids behave wrongly. Therefore, some children become rebellious, impolite and disrespectful of others - characteristics of Kong Kids.

Finally, Hong Kong is an exam-obsessed city where most parents emphasise their children's academic results. The parents understate the need for resilience in their kids. Some children are expected to focus exclusively on academic matters, and not housework or other chores. As a result, these kids become dependent, both physically and psychologically, that is, they become Kong Kids.

Effects

Dependent individuals
Kids with "Kong Kid" symptoms have little ability to care for themselves and poor problem-solving skills. When faced with adversity, they immediately give up which can lead to feelings of melancholia and, in serious cases, suicide. Kong Kids tend to remain childlike and stunted psychologically.

For instance, in December 2010, a snowstorm paralysed the London Heathrow Airport, many Hong Kong students who came home for holiday were stranded at the airport. They stayed in the banquet rooms of hotels or slept in the airport. During that period, those Hong Kong students complained continuously about the situation and that the banquet rooms were like concentration camps.

Kong Kids have negative effects on themselves. Being spoiled, they do not know how to take care of themselves but to depend on others to live their lives. Therefore, Kong Kids have low self-care ability when compared to normal kids. For most of the time, Kong Kids' parents will help them to deal with all difficulties they face, such as handling conflicts between friends and communicating with teachers. In short term, Kong Kids lose a lot of social chances and cannot deal with hurdles by themselves while in long term, Kong Kids will lack essential communication skills and  initiation of solving problems.

Poor family situations and relationships
Because the children rely excessively on others for care, this pressures parents to be responsible for their child's actions. The embarrassment and frustration of managing children's poor behaviour at home and in public prevents the growth of a healthy parent-child relationship and parents may feel frustrated and humiliated by their children's behaviour.

Burdens for Hong Kong's society 
Children are the future generations, but Kong Kids may not be equipped to survive in the real world as they are unable to interact with and accommodate others. They do not cherish what they have and are less able to tolerate hardships at work and are at risk for termination of employment. This decreases the effectiveness of the workforce.

Kong Kids also negatively impact society. Depending on their parents, Kong Kids have low problem-solving abilities. As a result, once they step into society, they cannot solve problems efficiently, decreasing the productive potential of society. Because their parents solve their problems for them, Kong Kids usually lack motivation to work. The short supply of motivated and enthusiastic citizens reduces the society's competitiveness and therefore its affluence.

Solution
To avoid children becoming Kong Kids, parents and schools need to cooperate. According to child and education psychologists, parents should stop over-protecting their children and allow them to learn life self-care skills from daily life like buttoning shirts, tying shoe laces and feeding themselves. They should explain to their children the importance of these skills but not simply tell them to follow. Moreover, parents need to give children room to learn being independent. In order to equip children with the ability to cope with adversity, when they face difficulties, parents should let children solve it on their own rather than tackling it for them. While at school, teachers should guide students to develop interpersonal skills. This is a rare opportunity at home as the family sizes are usually small.

In media
In the book Kong Kids: The Nightmares for Parents and Teachers, written by Wong Ming Lok, Hong Kong Children are defined as those born from the middle of 90s to the early 2000s, which is an affluent era with information explosion.
Other literature denote Kong Kids as the "3-low Kong Kid". According to the newspaper article which originated this term, Hong Kong children have low autonomy, low emotion quotient and also low studying ability. Some of them do not help with the chores. They do not know how to change their clothes, shower themselves, tie the shoelaces and even tidy up Hong Kong children are vulnerable, not adaptable to challenges and difficulties, some of them may commit suicide due to academic pressure, family and emotional issues.

On 9 July 2011, a video entitled Tai Po Impolite Kong Kid Scolding Parents was filmed by witnesses to the incident, posted on websites like YouTube, and was reported by the media.

In the three-minute video, a young boy with his hands on his hips shouted and condemned his parents for "forcing" him to accompany them to the Tai Po supermarket. He threatened to call the police and despite a surrounding crowd, spoke foul language when his parents asked him to be quiet. A passer-by, unable to stand the child's behaviour, gave the child HK$20 so that he could take a taxi home and stop harassing his parents. This video hit the local news and magazines.

See also
 Education in Hong Kong
 "Four–two–one" or "4–2–1" phenomenon
 Helicopter parents
 Narcissism
 Princess sickness
 Spoiled child

References

Culture of Hong Kong
Hong Kong children
Hong Kong society
Parenting
Social issues in China
Stereotypes of East Asian people